The 2013 NBA draft was held on June 27, 2013, at the Barclays Center in Brooklyn, New York. National Basketball Association (NBA) teams took turns selecting amateur U.S. college basketball players and other eligible players, including international players. State Farm was the presenting sponsor. The lottery took place on May 21, 2013. This was the first draft for New Orleans under their new Pelicans name after playing as the New Orleans Hornets previously. It would also be the last draft for the Charlotte Bobcats under their old name, as they resumed playing under their old Hornets moniker that they last used in 2002 once the 2013–14 NBA season was over. Anthony Bennett, the first pick in the draft, had a very limited amount of media outlets considering him as a potential #1 pick in the draft. He bounced around the league and then was finally released by the Brooklyn Nets in January 2017 after averaging just 5.2 PPG.

Highlights of the draft included the first Canadian number one selection (Anthony Bennett). The draft also included the first Canadian pair of lottery picks (Bennett and Kelly Olynyk), the first Iranian draft choice (Arsalan Kazemi), the first New Zealander first round pick (Steven Adams) , the Bucks’ selection of Giannis Antetokounmpo, and the last first round draft selections announced by then-NBA commissioner David Stern, the last of which included a visit by Hakeem Olajuwon, Stern's first pick he ever announced back in 1984. He was replaced by current commissioner Adam Silver beginning with the 2014 NBA draft.

Draft selections

Notable undrafted players

These players were not selected in the 2013 NBA draft but have played at least one game in the NBA.

Eligibility and entrants

The draft is conducted under the eligibility rules established in the league's new 2011 collective bargaining agreement (CBA) with its players union. The CBA that ended the 2011 lockout instituted no immediate changes to the draft, but called for a committee of owners and players to discuss future changes. , the basic eligibility rules for the draft are listed below.
 All drafted players must be at least 19 years old during the calendar year of the draft. In terms of dates, players eligible for the 2013 draft must be born on or before December 31, 1994.
 Any player who is not an "international player", as defined in the CBA, must be at least one year removed from the graduation of his high school class. The CBA defines "international players" as players who permanently resided outside the U.S. for three years prior to the draft, did not complete high school in the U.S., and have never enrolled at a U.S. college or university.

Early entrants
Player who are not automatically eligible must declare their eligibility for the draft by notifying the NBA offices in writing no later than 60 days before the draft. For the 2013 draft, this date fell on April 28. Under NCAA rules, players will only have until April 16 to withdraw from the draft and maintain their college eligibility.

A player who has hired an agent will forfeit his remaining college eligibility, regardless of whether he is drafted. Also, while the CBA allows a player to withdraw from the draft twice, the NCAA mandates that a player who has declared twice loses his college eligibility.

College underclassmen
Forty-five college players declared for the draft.

 Steven Adams – C, Pittsburgh (freshman)
 C. J. Aiken – F, Saint Joseph's (junior)
 Anthony Bennett – F, UNLV (freshman)
 Vander Blue – G, Marquette (junior)
 Lorenzo Brown – G, North Carolina State (junior)
 Reggie Bullock – F, North Carolina (junior)
 Trey Burke – G, Michigan (sophomore)
 Kentavious Caldwell-Pope – G, Georgia (sophomore)
 Michael Carter-Williams – G, Syracuse (sophomore)
 Adrien Coleman – G/F, Bethune-Cookman (junior)
 Allen Crabbe – G, California (junior)
 Dewayne Dedmon – C, USC (junior)
 Gorgui Dieng – C, Louisville (junior)
 Jamaal Franklin – G, San Diego State (junior)
 Kiwi Gardner – G, Midland College (sophomore)
 Archie Goodwin – G, Kentucky (freshman)
 Tim Hardaway Jr. – G, Michigan (junior)
 Grant Jerrett – F, Arizona (freshman)
 Christian Kabongo – G, Morgan State (junior)
 Myck Kabongo – G, Texas (sophomore)
 Shane Larkin – G, Miami (Florida) (sophomore)
 Ricky Ledo – G, Providence (freshman)
 Alex Len – C, Maryland (sophomore)
 C. J. Leslie – F, North Carolina State (junior)
 Nurideen Lindsey – G, Rider (junior)
 Amath M'Baye – F, Oklahoma (junior)
 Ray McCallum Jr. – G, Detroit (junior)
 Ben McLemore – G, Kansas (freshman)
 Tony Mitchell – F, North Texas (sophomore)
 Shabazz Muhammad – G/F, UCLA (freshman)
 Nerlens Noel – C, Kentucky (freshman)
 Victor Oladipo – G/F, Indiana (junior)
 Kelly Olynyk – C, Gonzaga (junior)
 Otto Porter – F, Georgetown (sophomore)
 Marshawn Powell – F, Arkansas (junior)
 Phil Pressey – G, Missouri (junior)
 André Roberson – F, Colorado (junior)
 Trevis Simpson – G, UNC Greensboro (junior)
 Tony Snell – F, New Mexico (junior)
 Tahj Tate – G, Delaware State (sophomore)
 John Taylor – G, Fresno Pacific (junior)
 Adonis Thomas – G/F, Memphis (sophomore)
 Deshaun Thomas – F, Ohio State (junior)
 B. J. Young – G, Arkansas (sophomore)
 Cody Zeller – F/C, Indiana (sophomore)

International players
Fifteen players who did not attend college in the US or Canada between the ages of 18 and 22 declared for the draft.

  Álex Abrines – G/F, FC Barcelona (Spain)
  Giannis Antetokounmpo – G/F, Filathlitikos B.C. (Greece)
  László Dobos – C, Basket Zaragoza (Spain)
  Rudy Gobert – C, Cholet Basket (France)
  Livio Jean-Charles – F, ASVEL Basket (France)
  Sergey Karasev – G/F, BC Triumph Lyubertsy (Russia)
  Raulzinho Neto – G, Gipuzkoa BC (Spain)
  Lucas Nogueira – C, CB Estudiantes (Spain)
  Alexandre Paranhos – F, CR Flamengo (Brazil)
  Bogdan Radosavljević – C, FC Bayern Munich (Germany)
  Dennis Schröder – G, Basketball Löwen Braunschweig (Germany)
  Strahinja Stojačić – G, KK Smederevo (Serbia)
  Daniel Theis – F/C, Basketball Ulm (Germany)
  Jānis Timma – F, BK Ventspils (Latvia)
  Marko Todorović – C, FC Barcelona (Spain)

Automatically eligible entrants
Players who do not meet the criteria for "international" players are automatically eligible if they meet any of the following criteria:
 They have completed 4 years of their college eligibility.
 If they graduated from high school in the U.S., but did not enroll in a U.S. college or university, four years have passed since their high school class graduated.
 They have signed a contract with a professional basketball team outside of the NBA, anywhere in the world, and have played under that contract.

Players who meet the criteria for "international" players are automatically eligible if they meet any of the following criteria:
 They are least 22 years old during the calendar year of the draft. In terms of dates, players born on or before December 31, 1991, are automatically eligible for the 2013 draft.
 They have signed a contract with a professional basketball team outside of the NBA within the United States, and have played under that contract.

In addition to every college players who has completed their college eligibility and every "international" players who was born on or before December 31, 1991, the following player would also be eligible for selection in the 2013 NBA draft:
 Glen Rice Jr. – G, Rio Grande Valley Vipers (NBA D-League)

Draft lottery

The first 14 picks in the draft belong to teams that miss the playoffs; the order was determined through a lottery. The lottery determined the three teams that will obtain the first three picks on the draft. The remaining first-round picks and the second-round picks were assigned to teams in reverse order of their win–loss record in the previous season.

Below were the chances for each team to get specific picks in the 2013 draft lottery, rounded to three decimal places.

Invited attendees
The NBA annually invites around 10–15 players to sit in the so-called "green room", a special room set aside at the draft site for the invited players plus their families and agents. The following 13 players were invited (listed alphabetically) to the 2013 NBA draft.

 Steven Adams, Pittsburgh
 Anthony Bennett, UNLV
 Trey Burke, Michigan
 Kentavious Caldwell-Pope, Georgia
 Michael Carter-Williams, Syracuse
 Sergey Karasev, Triumph Lyubertsy
 Alex Len, Maryland
 CJ McCollum, Lehigh
 Ben McLemore, Kansas
 Nerlens Noel, Kentucky
 Victor Oladipo, Indiana
 Otto Porter, Georgetown
 Cody Zeller, Indiana

Trades involving draft picks

Pre-draft trades
Prior to the day of the draft, the following trades were made and resulted in exchanges of draft picks between the teams.

Draft-day trades
The following trades involving drafted players were made on the day of the draft.

See also
 List of first overall NBA draft picks

References

External links
Official Site
ESPN 2013 NBA Draft

Draft
National Basketball Association draft
NBA draft
NBA draft
2010s in Brooklyn
Basketball in New York City
Sporting events in New York City
Sports in Brooklyn
Events in Brooklyn, New York